Jeffrey Christian (born July 30, 1970) is a Canadian-American former ice hockey forward who was drafted 23rd overall by the New Jersey Devils. He played 18 games in the National Hockey League for the New Jersey Devils, Pittsburgh Penguins, and the Phoenix Coyotes and played professionally in North American and Europe for over two decades. After his playing career was completed, Christian joined the Columbus Jr. Blue Jackets as a head coach for parts of three seasons. Christian was hired by the Wheeling Nailers midway into the 2015-16 as an assistant coach and was later named Head Coach, holding the position from July 2016 to the completion of the 2017–18 season.

Playing career
Born in Burlington, Ontario, Christian was drafted 23rd overall by the New Jersey Devils in the 1988 NHL Entry Draft and attended six NHL training camps with the Devils. Christian played two games for New Jersey during the 1991–92 season, scoring no points.  He played in the American Hockey League (AHL) with the Utica Devils and the Albany River Rats. After four full seasons with the Devils organization, Christian signed a three-year contract with the Pittsburgh Penguins. He appeared in 15 games for the Pittsburgh Penguins over three seasons, scoring two goals and two assists during the 1996–97 season. During these years, Christian played alongside the all time NHL greats like Mario Lemieux, Jaromir Jagr, Ron Francis, Petr Nedved, Tomas Sandstrom, Luc Robitallie, Larry Murphy, Joe Mullen and John Cullen. Christian was the MVP of the Cleveland Lumberjacks, scoring 40 goals and 40 assists in 66 games during the 1996–97 International Hockey League (IHL) season.  Christian played one more game in the NHL for the Phoenix Coyotes, then two more years in the IHL for the Las Vegas Thunder and Houston Aeros before returning to the Lumberjacks.  Christian then moved to Europe, spending four seasons in the Deutsche Eishockey Liga for the Krefeld Pinguine, DEG Metro Stars, and Hannover Scorpions; and one season in the Elite Ice Hockey League in the United Kingdom for the Sheffield Steelers.  Christian returned to North America in 2005 joining the Central Hockey League's Youngstown Steelhounds and Tulsa Oilers.  After two successful seasons with the Oilers, Jeff was the first player signed by the CHL expansion team, the Missouri Mavericks, for the 2009–10 season.  He also served as an assistant coach for the Mavericks.

On September 11, 2010, he signed for the CHL's Mississippi RiverKings, based in Southaven, Mississippi, twenty minutes away from Memphis, Tennessee, where his daughter, Ryan, was being treated for cancer at St. Jude Children's Research Hospital.  On February 22, 2011, the RiverKings waived Christian, but he was picked up on waivers the next day by the Evansville IceMen, also of the CHL. In his final game, Christian had an assist and scored the game-winning goal in a shoot-out.

He is one of only a few players in hockey history to play over 1400 professional games (1406) while scoring over 500 goals (574), over 700 assists (792) and having over 3300 penalty minutes (3370).

Coaching and Consulting Career
Throughout his playing career, Christian held the role of player/assistant coach several times. In the summer of 2006 when the Youngstown Steelhounds (Central Hockey League) fired Head Coach Jean LaForest they turned to Christian to evaluate the hockey operations department, recruit and sign players. The Missouri Mavericks (Central Hockey League) signed Christian as the 1st player ever in their history. In the role of player/assistant coach, Christian helped build the inaugural Mavericks team along with Head Coach Scott Hillman. Christian took a break from hockey and coaching while fighting cancer with his daughter Ryan. After her passing, Christian became Head Coach of the AAA Ohio Jr BlueJackets for two and a half seasons. He coached the 2002 birth year and the 2003 birth year. He took the 2002 Pee Wee to the prestigious Quebec World Pee Wee Tournament. After a chance meeting with Pittsburgh Penguins Assistant General Manager Bill Guerin at a Cleveland area rink, Christian was hired as an assistant coach for the Wheeling Nailers of the ECHL in January 2016. Took over as head coach of the Nailers during the second round of the 2016 Kelly Cup playoffs when David Gove took a personal leave of absence to deal with his drug addiction. Christian guided the Nailers to the Kelly Cup finals, losing to the Allen Americans in six games.  On July 12, 2016, Christian was named as the Nailers' head coach. After a two-year stint as the Nailers' head coach, his contract was not renewed after not making the Kelly Cup playoffs in either season. It was reported that he was harassing female fans. Under his guidance the Nailers had a winning regular season record of 69-58-16-1. Also, Christian shares the All Time Nailers' playoff wins record with 10. Since parting ways with the Nailers, Christian became a skill coach in the Columbus, Ohio area working with individual players, their families and teams. Also, Christian was flown to Austria to consult with Villach in the top Austrian Hockey League (EBEL). Since this consulting trip Christian has become a Hockey Consultant working closely with several North American and European teams. Amongst the many services he provides are player evaluations, player recruiting, agent/team relations, staff and systems evaluation.

While with the Pittsburgh Penguins organization, Christian was Head Coach and Director of Hockey Operations of their AA affiliate in Wheeling, WV. He was responsible for all aspects of the Hockey Operations Department including recruiting/signing players, arranging housing, planning the season schedule and coordinating road trips, public appearances include radio/TV and delivering Christmas gifts to the less fortunate. Christian also oversaw the Hockey Operations budget and managed the salary cap.

Christian attended the NHL Draft, Prospect, Development and Training Camps with the Pittsburgh Penguins. Jeff was actively involved in these camps evaluating the players and went on the ice with Penguins players/prospects.

Currently, Christian is head coach for the Northeast Storm, a Columbus area high school varsity team.

Personal and philanthropic life
Born in Burlington, Ontario, Jeff spent the first seven years of his life in the tough east end of Hamilton, Ontario, where he later trained at the famous McGory's boxing gym as a teen. Jeff is the son of two time Grey Cup Champion with the Hamilton Tiger-Cats, tight end Gord Christian. The Christian family moved to the small village of Mount Hope where Gord, and mother Diane, raised seven children. Three of these brothers, Gord, Brandon, and Michael, played professional hockey. Jeff was a stand out athlete at Ancaster High School and enshrined on the Ancaster High School Wall of Fame. He played hockey, football and basketball. As quarterback and linebacker of the Ancaster Royals JV team, Christian won championships two out of three years.

Jeff and Dorie Christian were married July 21, 2001 at the Old Mill in Ancaster, Ontario. They have two daughters, Ryan Elise and Tyler Rachel. The Christian's lost Ryan Elise to an extremely rare cancer on January 24, 2013, after a three-year fight.

Throughout his playing career, Jeff was award the Community Service Award for giving back to children and the community. The Jeff Christian Charitable Foundation was founded in 2005 in Youngstown, Ohio to benefit under privileged children in the area. The JCCF later benefited the children in the great Tulsa area as well.

After being signed with the Missouri Mavericks, he lived in the Kansas City suburb of Blue Springs, Missouri, with his wife, Dorie and daughter, Ryan.  While playing with the Mavericks, Ryan (age 8) was diagnosed with Pediatric Adrenal cortical Carcinoma, a rare cancer. Ryan was treated at St. Jude Children's Research Hospital in Memphis, Tennessee.

Christian retired after the 2010–11 season. After retiring, Christian and his family moved back to the Kansas City/Independence Missouri area where Jeff became the first Director of Hockey at the Carriage Club. The Christian family's journey and Ryan's fight were the subject of a feature article in Sports Net Magazine. As Ryan's three year fight progressed the Christian Family moved to Columbus Ohio. On January 24, 2013, Ryan lost her three-year battle with cancer.

Currently living in the Columbus, Ohio area with his family, he founded and runs the Team Ryan Charitable Foundation. The Team Ryan Charitable Foundation for Pediatric Cancer Research has been established to honor Ryan, raise money and awareness for pediatric cancer research. As Founder and President, Jeff is directly responsible for organizing, planning, promoting and executing fundraisers that benefit leading pediatric cancer research institutes such as St Jude Children's Research Hospital and the Princess Margaret Cancer Center. Jeff often gives talks/speeches on numerous subjects ranging from his life in minor league hockey to what life after losing a child is like.

Christian is also a certified Realtor and a hockey skills coach/consultant.

Awards and accolades
1990-91: Leading Rookie Scorer, Utica Devils (AHL)
1990-91: Rookie Of The Year, Utica Devils (AHL)
1994-95: Community Service Award, Cleveland Lumberjacks (IHL)
1996-97: Team MVP, Cleveland Lumberjacks (IHL)
1998-99: John Cullen Award (Sportsmanship), Houston Aeros (IHL)
1998-99: Turner Cup Champion, Houston Aeros (IHL)
1999-00: Community Service Award, Cleveland Lumberjacks (IHL)
2005-06: First Team All-Star, Central Hockey League
2005-06: Most Valuable Player runner-up, Central Hockey League 
2005-06; 2006-07: Scored the game-winning goal in back-to-back CHL All-Star Games. Christian's sticks from those respective games are currently in the Hockey Hall Of Fame archives.
2006-07: Leading Scorer, Central Hockey League 
2006-07: First-Team All Star, Central Hockey League
2006-07: League MVP, Central Hockey League

Christian wore a Captain's letter on his jersey 11 seasons and played in 5 All Star Games.

Career statistics

References

External links
 
 Jeff Christian EliteProspects.com Profile

1970 births
Living people
New Jersey Devils draft picks
Albany River Rats players
Canadian ice hockey left wingers
Cleveland Barons (2001–2006) players
Cleveland Lumberjacks players
Cincinnati Cyclones (IHL) players
DEG Metro Stars players
Evansville IceMen players
Hamilton Canucks players
Hannover Scorpions players
Ice hockey people from Ontario
Houston Aeros (1994–2013) players
Krefeld Pinguine players
Las Vegas Thunder players
London Knights players
Mississippi RiverKings (CHL) players
Missouri Mavericks players
New Jersey Devils players
Owen Sound Platers players
Pittsburgh Penguins players
Phoenix Coyotes players
Rockford IceHogs (AHL) players
Sheffield Steelers players
Sportspeople from Burlington, Ontario
Tulsa Oilers (1992–present) players
Utica Devils players
Youngstown Steelhounds players
Canadian expatriate ice hockey players in England
Canadian expatriate ice hockey players in Germany
Canadian expatriate ice hockey players in the United States